The East Ballarat Football Club was an Australian rules football club which competed in the Ballarat Football League.

First formed in 1885 the club remained a junior club in their district, their senior club being Ballarat Imperial Football Club.

The upheaval of the 1930s in which the Ballarat competition merged with the Wimmera league for three years resulted with the dissolving of the Imperial. Reformed during the WWII the club in 1944 was promoted to the top level BFL competition. They won six premierships in 1949, 1950, 1964, 1989, 1990 & 1993.

They merged with Golden Point in 2001 to form the East Point Football Club.

Premierships
 Ballarat Football League (6): 1949, 1950, 1964, 1989, 1990, 1993

Notable players
Graham Donaldson
Danny Frawley
Mark Orchard
Sean Simpson
Tony Evans

See also
 Golden Point Football Club
 East Point Football Club

References

Ballarat Football League clubs
Australian rules football clubs established in 1885
Australian rules football clubs disestablished in 2001
1885 establishments in Australia
2001 disestablishments in Australia